Lu Yen-hsun and Danai Udomchoke were the defending champions, but lost in the quarterfinals to Jamie Murray and John Peers.
Murray and Peers went on to win the title, defeating Tomasz Bednarek and Johan Brunström in the final, 6–3, 3–6, [10–6].

Seeds

Draw

Draw

References
 Main Draw

Doubles
PTT Thailand Open - Doubles
 in Thai tennis